Great Point Light, officially Nantucket Light, is a lighthouse located on the northernmost point of Nantucket Island. First built in 1784, the original wooden tower was destroyed by fire in 1816. The following year a stone tower was erected which stood until toppled in a storm in March 1984. Rebuilt again in 1986, the stone tower was built to replicate the old one, and still remains in operation today.

The lighthouse sits on a thin spit of beach where the currents of the Atlantic Ocean and Nantucket Sound meet.

It was added to the National Register of Historic Places in 1982 as Nantucket Light and removed after the destruction of the listed structure in 1986.

See also 
 Lightship Nantucket

References

External links
Great Point Light History

Lighthouses completed in 1784
Lighthouses completed in 1817
Lighthouses completed in 1986
Lighthouses in Nantucket, Massachusetts
Lighthouses on the National Register of Historic Places in Massachusetts
Former National Register of Historic Places in Massachusetts
National Register of Historic Places in Nantucket, Massachusetts